William John Egan (22 February 1898 – 22 April 1988) was an Australian rules footballer who played with Melbourne in the Victorian Football League (VFL).

Notes

External links 

 

1898 births
1988 deaths
Australian rules footballers from Victoria (Australia)
Melbourne Football Club players
People from Cardinia